"Alone Again" is a song by Canadian singer Alyssa Reid featuring P. Reign, based on the lyrics and music of the 1987 Heart song "Alone". The song was released in the United Kingdom featuring vocals from Jump Smokers.

"Alone Again" was released in November 2010, entering the Canadian Hot 100 at no. 79 for the week of January 1, 2011, and peaked at no. 11 the week of April 23, 2011. Alone Again was the top-selling and highest-charting single by a Canadian artist at Canadian radio in 2011. A different version with Jump Smokers was released internationally, becoming a major hit in parts of Europe, peaking within the top ten of the charts in Poland and the United Kingdom. Another version was made, which features vocals sections from both Jump Smokers and P. Reign.

Music video
The music video was directed by Marc Andre DeBruyne. It was first released onto YouTube on 18 May 2011 at a total length of four minutes and five seconds. The video went to number one at MuchMusic and was nominated for a 2011 MMVA for 'Pop Video of the Year'.

Track listing
 Digital download (feat. P. Reign)
 "Alone Again" (feat. P. Reign) - 3:57

 UK Digital download (feat. Jump Smokers)
 "Alone Again" (UK Radio Edit) - 3:09
 "Alone Again" (Original Mix) - 3:37
 "Alone Again" (Sunship UK Radio Edit) - 3:08
 "Alone Again" (Sunship Mix) - 5:22
 "Alone Again" (Sunship Dub Mix) - 4:53
 "Alone Again" (Steve Smart & Westfunk Radio Edit) - 3:10
 "Alone Again" (Steve Smart & Westfunk Mix) - 5:15
 "Alone Again" (Original US Radio Edit) - 3:48

Charts and certifications

Weekly charts

Year-end charts

Certifications

Release history

References

2010 singles
Alyssa Reid songs
2010 songs
Songs written by Billy Steinberg
Songs written by Tom Kelly (musician)
Songs written by Alyssa Reid
Songs written by James Ash